Gülnur Tumbat (born 1975) is a Turkish female academic in marketing as well as amateur mountain climber and ultramarathon runner. Currently, she lives in San Francisco, California.

Early years
Gülnur Tumbat was born to a teacher father and a seamstress mother as the youngest of three daughters in Denizli in 1975. After finishing high school, she studied Environmental Engineering at the Middle East Technical University (METU) in Ankara with a master's degree in the same field. She further received a master's degree in Business Administration from Bilkent University. Then, Tumbat obtained a PhD degree in Marketing in the United States.

Since 2005, she has been serving as a professor in the Marketing Faculty at San Francisco State University.

Sports

Mountain climbing
Tumbat began mountain climbing at age 17 in the Mountaineering & Winter Sports Club of the METU. She was on the top of more than 30 high-elevation mountains in Turkey, Russia, Georgia, Nepal, Argentina, and the US so far. Her doctoral thesis was on the subject of marketing and consuming risk. To study the subject, she joined a group of mountain climbers at the main camp at Mount Everest in 2004.

Her goal is to be the first Turk and Turkish woman to climb the "Eight Summits", an extension of the Seven Summits with addition of Mount Carstensz in the Oceania continent. The first Turkish seven summiter is Nasuh Mahruki. Only twelve women in the world have completed the ascent to the "Eight Summits" to date.

Gülnur Tumbat climbed the McKinley (6,194 m), Aconcagua (6,959 m), Kilimanjaro (5,895 m), Elbrus (5,642 m), and Carstensz Pyramid (4,884 m). She notes that her most challenging ascent was to Aconcagua, the highest point in South America, where she climbed solo and without the assistance of a professional mountain guide or a team.

In April 2014, her attempt to climb Mount Everest failed as the ascent to the summit was officially barred after a major avalanche killed more than ten mountaineers at 5,800 m elevation. She was not hurt by the accident. In July 2015, she ascended Carstensz Pyramid (4,884 m), completing her fifth summit of the "Eight Highest Peaks", in a group of six mountaineers from South Korea, Australia, France and Sweden.

On May 21, 2018 she became the first Turkish woman to summit Mount Everest from the Nepal side, known in Nepali as Sagarmāthā and in Tibetan as Chomolungma, the Earth's highest mountain. To this day she has completed 6 of the 7 summits (with Carstenz) with the exception of Antarctica's highest, Mount Vinson.

Endurance sports
Tumbat has done some triathlons such as Marin County Triathlon and Alcatraz Triathlon. She has also been taking part  in multiple adventure races such as Gold Rush 30-hour Adventure Racing   and ultramarathon competitions in California, where she lives. Her achievements are:

References

1975 births
Living people
People from Denizli
Middle East Technical University alumni
Bilkent University alumni
San Francisco State University alumni
San Francisco State University faculty
Marketing women
Turkish expatriates in the United States
Turkish mountain climbers
Turkish female long-distance runners
Turkish ultramarathon runners
Female ultramarathon runners